Martijn Lakemeier (born 17 September 1993 in Zwijndrecht) is a Dutch actor.

Career
He is best known for his performance as Michiel in Winter in Wartime for which he won several awards including the Golden Calf for Best Actor (2009). He is the youngest winner of a Golden Calf for Best Actor to date.

He played roles in several Dutch films and TV series, such as De Marathon (2012), The Secrets of Barslet (2012), It's All So Quiet (2013), Ventoux (2015) and Yes I do (2015). On TV he can be seen in the series Dutch Hope (2014), which won the Golden Calf for Best TV series.

Lakemeier studied acting at the Maastricht Academy of Dramatic Arts.

Lakemeier starred as Johan, a young Dutch soldier in the 2020 film De Oost. His character Johan served under the controversial Royal Netherlands East Indies Army (KNIL) officer Raymond Westerling in South Sulawesi during the Indonesian National Revolution.

Filmography
 Winter in Wartime (2008)
 Lover of Loser (2009)
 De Marathon (2012)
 Adios Amigos (2016)
 De Oost (2020)

References

External links 
 
 

1993 births
Living people
21st-century Dutch male actors
Dutch male film actors
Golden Calf winners
Maastricht Academy of Dramatic Arts alumni
People from Zwijndrecht, Netherlands